Komanda was a sport newspaper published daily in Kyiv, Ukraine. 

It was founded in 1995, and as of September 2001 it was available online. It offered sport analysis, original interviews, and opinions. It was published in Russian.

Its registration number KBN 2163 of 18 September 1996. The subscription index is 33780. The newspaper was published five (5) times a week, no Sunday or Monday editions. It was part of UMH group. In December 2016, it closed.

Staff
 Director – Oleksandr Tymchyna
 Chief editor – Yuriy Karman
 Manager of Lviv division – Vasyl Mykhailov
 Manager of football news section – Valeriy Novobranets
 Secretary – Serhiy Pylkevych
 Technical editor – Danylo Radovskiy
 Website editor – Serhiy Berov

The paper's motto is "Of what screams and whispers the world of sport".
 The paper consists of nine (9) sections: football, autosport, basketball, hockey, tennis, box, chess, other, and behind curtains. 
 There are about 30 authors from Ukraine and Europe that contribute to the newspaper, including Grandmaster Mikhail Golubev. 
 The paper's website demonstrates the rating among the most interesting articles; taking a variety of different public polls; has forum to address issues, express an opinion, and/or give a suggestion. The website also provides with an extensive archive database of all previous editions and it also gives a detail information about subscription.

References

External links
 

1995 establishments in Ukraine
2016 disestablishments in Ukraine
Daily newspapers published in Ukraine
Defunct daily newspapers
Defunct newspapers published in Ukraine
Mass media in Kyiv
Newspapers established in 1995
Publications disestablished in 2016
Russian-language newspapers published in Ukraine
Sports mass media in Ukraine
Sports newspapers